Xuriella prima is the type species of jumping spider in the genus Xuriella first described in 2000 by Wanda Wesołowska and Anthony Russell-Smith. First discovered in Tanzania, it has also been identified in South Africa and Zimbabwe.

Description

Etymology
The species name is derived from the Latin for first as it is the first of the genus to be identified and is thus the type species for the genus Xuriella.

Distribution
Xuriella prima was first described from examples found in the Mkomazi National Park in Tanzania in 2000 by Wanda Wesołowska and Anthony Russell-Smith. Subsequently, the species was also identified in South Africa and Zimbabwe.

References

External links
 Salticidae.org: Diagnostic drawings of Xuriella prima

Salticidae
Arthropods of Tanzania
Arthropods of Zimbabwe
Spiders of Africa
Spiders of South Africa
Spiders described in 2000
Taxa named by Wanda Wesołowska